The Indulkana Range is a range of hills in the northwest of South Australia. It is sometimes called the Mount Chandler Range after its highest peak. It is located to the southwest of Indulkana, on the Aṉangu Pitjantjatjara Yankunytjatjara lands. The mountains of the Indulkana area are part of the traditional country of the Yankunytjatjara and Antakarinya.

The range consists of a series of parallel ridges running east to west. The southern side of the range ends in an escarpment, the most prominent point of which is Chambers Bluff. The rock is primarily composed of quartzite and sandstone, resting on slate beds of kaolinised clay. It is composed of quartzite and sandstone. Slightly north of the escarpment, and following its path from east to west, is a series of gorges that split the hills and contain several reliable springs.

References

Other websites
Geological details from Geoscience Australia:
Indulkana Shale
Mount Chandler Sandstone
Chambers Bluff Tillite

Mountain ranges of South Australia
Anangu Pitjantjatjara Yankunytjatjara